is a junction passenger railway station located in the town of Taki, Taki District, Mie Prefecture, operated by Central Japan Railway Company (JR Central).

Lines
Taki Station is served by the Kisei Main Line and is 42.5 rail kilometers from the terminus of that line at Kameyama Station. It is also the western terminus for the 29.1 kilometer Sangū Line to Toba Station. Irregular freight services are still operated by the Japan Freight Railway Company.

Station layout
The station consists of two island platforms  connected by a footbridge. The station has a Midori no Madoguchi staffed ticket office.

Platforms

Adjacent stations

History
The Sangū Railway was nationalized on October 1, 1907, becoming part of the Japanese Government Railways (JGR) system. On October 20, 1923, the Kisei East Line connected to the station, which was renamed . The JGR became the Japan National Railways (JNR) after World War II, and the station was renamed to its present name on July 15, 1959. The station was absorbed into the JR Central network upon the privatization of the JNR on April 1, 1987. Scheduled freight operations were discontinued from 2016.

Passenger statistics
In fiscal 2019, the station was used by an average of 560 passengers daily (boarding passengers only).

Surrounding area
Kushida River
Japan National Route 42
Old Ise Grand Shrine pilgrimage road

References

External links

 JR Central timetable 
 JR Central: Taki Station 

Railway stations in Japan opened in 1893
Railway stations in Mie Prefecture
Taki, Mie